Arecuna may refer to:
 Arecuna or Pemon, an ethnic group of South America
 Arecuna language or Pemon language, a Cariban language

See also 
 Arikun people, an ethnic group of Taiwan

Language and nationality disambiguation pages